Levi Williams is an American football quarterback for the Utah State Aggies. Williams went to Smithson Valley High School and he started his collegiate career with the Wyoming Cowboys.

High school career 
Williams attended Smithson Valley High School in Comal County, Texas. In his senior season, Williams threw for 32 touchdowns with 3,239 yards and had 1,230 rushing yards with 16 rushing touchdowns. Williams was a consensus 3-star recruit and according to 247Sports.com he was the 40th best pro style quarterback in the class of 2019. Williams was originally committed to Houston but he decided to play college football at the University of Wyoming over Baylor, Oklahoma State, and TCU.

College career

Wyoming 
Williams played sparingly in his freshman season. He would make his first career start in the Arizona Bowl where he would throw for three touchdowns and he would also have a rushing touchdown in a 38–17 win against Georgia State. In the next season, Williams played in all six games in a shortened season rushing for 6 touchdowns while only having one passing touchdown with three interceptions. Williams would play in eight games the following season. After a three-game losing streak Williams was named the starting quarterback against San Jose State. Wyoming lost 21-27 behind two touchdowns and two interceptions from Williams. He finished the season with 8 passing touchdowns with 5 interceptions and one rushing touchdown. In the Famous Idaho Potato Bowl against Kent State, Williams threw for one touchdown with 127 yards and he rushed for 200 yards and 4 touchdowns in the 52–38 win. After his performance, Williams was named the game's MVP. On December 22, 2021, just one day after the game, Williams announced his decision to transfer.

Utah State
On December 30, 2021, Williams announced his decision to transfer to Utah State.

References

External links 
 Wyoming Cowboys Bio

Living people
Players of American football from Texas
Wyoming Cowboys football players
Year of birth missing (living people)
American football quarterbacks
Utah State Aggies football players